Demonassa capitalis is a species of beetle in the family Cerambycidae. It was described by Blackburn in 1908. It is known from Australia.

References

Zygocerini
Beetles described in 1908